Paul Lawrence Brady (born September 28, 1927) is an American civil rights advocate, author and former federal administrative law judge, the first African-American to achieve this position in 1972. He retired in 1997.

Biography
Born in Flint, Michigan, he graduated from Flint Central High School. After high school, he served in the United States Navy. He was a private practice judge, a Social Security Administration hearing examiner and a trial attorney for the Federal Power Commission. He was a graduate of the University of Michigan, the University of Kansas and Washburn University.

Brady published A Certain Blindness chronicling his ancestors history on their arrival in the United States, and received many accolades from civil rights groups during his career. Brady was the great-nephew of Bass Reeves, who was among the first African Americans to receive a commission as a Deputy U.S. Marshal west of the Mississippi River, and the second husband of Xernona Clayton, a civil rights leader.

Notes

1927 births
Living people
University of Michigan alumni
University of Kansas alumni
Washburn University alumni
American civil rights activists
American judges
Flint Central High School alumni
Writers from Flint, Michigan
United States Navy sailors